Liuli Gongfang or Liuligongfang is Taiwan's only contemporary glass studio devoted to artistic Chinese glassware. Since its establishment in 1987 Liuligongfang has become known in Asia and abroad for its outstanding artistic endeavours and its high standard of craftsmanship.

Liuligongfang was founded in 1987 by actress Loretta Yang and director Chang Yi. Their name refers to liuli, a form of archaic Chinese glasswork; the founders chose to use the word liuli, rather than the common name for glass, boli (玻璃) to honor their cultural origin. The founders aimed to revive the art of antique Chinese art glass, the production of which had dwindled following the First and Second Opium Wars in the 19th century. Yang mortgaged her house and those of all her family members in order to gain start-up capital. After much trial and error, costing $1 million and taking more than three years, she and Chang were able to master the French pate-de-verre or lost-wax casting method. At the time of their founding, they operated a two-person workshop in Tamsui, Taipei County (now New Taipei City). Yang and Chang originally had a fairly strict division of labour, with Yang handling the artistic aspects of their work, while Chang managed finances and other business responsibilities; with Chang's 1997 heart attack, Yang has taken over more of Chang's responsibilities as well, including contact with the media.

As of 2008, Liuli Gongfang employed 900 employees in 67 locations around the world, including 1 location in United States: South Coast Plaza, Orange County. Premium Retailers include Wynn in Las Vegas, Gump's in San Francisco, David Orgell in Las Vegas , London Jeweler and Corning Museum in New York. Their successes have earned them the moniker of "founders of contemporary Chinese glass art" and "the Georg Jensen of the glassware world". Works created by Liuli Gongfang have become part of the permanent collection of London's Victoria and Albert Museum as well as the Palace Museum in Beijing's Forbidden City. People First Party chairman James Soong, during his visit to mainland China (the second Taiwanese politician to do so, after that of Lien Chan), presented Communist Party General Secretary Hu Jintao with a Liuli Gongfang sculpture ; Hu gave him Jingde porcelain in return.

Loretta Hui-Shan Yang

A renowned performing artist in the Taiwan cinema, twice winner of the award for Best Leading Actress at the Golden Horse Awards and winner of the Best Actress prize at the Asia-Pacific Film Festival, the modern Chinese glass artist, Loretta Hui-Shan Yang has brought the beauty of her performances to modern Chinese glass. "Beauty transformed" is how Japanese critics have described the multiple talents of Loretta Hui-Shan Yang. Having committed herself to Chinese glass for more than a decade, she has single-handedly rediscovered the technique of cire-perdue glass casting. She has used this technique to create works in a traditional Chinese artistic language that are imbued with a Chinese philosophy of human relationships. Her success in this has established her position among the masters of world glass.

Liuli
"Liuli" means ancient Chinese glass/crystal. It has a lineage stretching back thousands of years, first making its appearance in the 11th century BC. The art of Liuli left an indelible trail throughout Chinese history until the 19th century when China opened its door to imported goods, and effectively stifled traditional artisan skills.

The discovery in 1968 of the tomb of Liu Shun, a nobleman from Man-Chung County in Hopei Province, unearthed the earliest recorded example of pate-de-verre. A glass ear cup was found behind the renowned "jade suit with gold thread." Archaeologists confirmed the glass material was of Chinese origin, indicating the pate-de-verre technique was indeed indigenous to China. This revelation was astounding and engendered in the group of artists a profound sense of mission to revive the artistry embedded in their own ancestry.

Collections around the world
Liuligongfang art works have been exhibited in Taiwan, Japan, Mainland China, Europe, and United States. Several pieces have become part of the permanent collection of some of the most well known museums. Including The Palace Museum, Beijing, Shanghai Fine Arts Museum, Tsui Museum of Art, HongKong, Medicine Buddha Temple in Nara, Japan, The National Museum of Women in the Arts in Washington D.C., United States, Victoria and Albert Museum in United Kingdom, Bowers Museum in California, United States.

See also
 List of companies of Taiwan

References

External links
Official homepage
United States Online Store

Chinese art
Glassmaking companies
Privately held companies
Taiwanese brands
Taiwanese companies established in 1987
Manufacturing companies established in 1987